Hechi Jinchengjiang Airport  is an airport serving in the city of Hechi in Guangxi Zhuang Autonomous Region, China. It is built on the Jiantang Mountain, in Hechi Town, Jinchengjiang District,  from the city center.

Construction began on 3 December 2008 with a total investment of 850 million yuan, and the airport was opened on 28 August 2014. Owing to the lack of flat land in the mountainous region, more than 60 hilltops were leveled to create the runway.

Facilities
The airport has one runway that is 2,200 meters long and 45 meters wide, and a 4,200 square-meter terminal building. It can handle three flights per hour.

Airlines and destinations

See also
List of airports in China
List of the busiest airports in China

References

Airports in Guangxi
Airports established in 2014
2014 establishments in China
Hechi